Pat Farrelly (28 May 1913 – 6 August 2007) was a former Australian rules footballer who played with Carlton and South Melbourne in the Victorian Football League (VFL).

In 1939 he moved on to VFA club Camberwell for greater reward, and played there until he enlisted in the Australian Army in 1941.

Notes

External links 

Pat Farrelly's profile at Blueseum
Big six at Camberwell

1913 births
2007 deaths
Carlton Football Club players
Sydney Swans players
City-South Football Club players
Camberwell Football Club players
Australian rules footballers from Tasmania